Quaker Hill is a former settlement in Nevada County, California. It lay at an elevation of 3310 feet (1009 m). It still appeared on maps as of 1938.

References

Former settlements in Nevada County, California
Former populated places in California